Nikita Vlasenko (born 20 March 2001) is a footballer who plays as a defender for the Croatian club Rijeka. Born in Ukraine, he is a youth international for Switzerland.

Career

Club career
In 2019, he signed for Italian Serie A side Juventus. In 2020, Vlasenko was sent on loan to Sion in Switzerland. In 2021, he was sent on loan to Dutch second division club Excelsior. On 20 August 2021, he debuted for Excelsior during a 1-1 draw with FC Volendam.

On 18 July 2022, Vlasenko signed with Rijeka in Croatia.

International career
Vlasenko is eligible to represent Ukraine internationally, having been born there.

References

External links
 

2001 births
Footballers from Donetsk
Association football defenders
Swiss people of Ukrainian descent
Swiss men's footballers
Living people
Juventus F.C. players
FC Sion players
Excelsior Rotterdam players
HNK Rijeka players
Eerste Divisie players
Swiss expatriate footballers
Swiss expatriate sportspeople in Italy
Swiss expatriate sportspeople in the Netherlands
Swiss expatriate sportspeople in Croatia
Expatriate footballers in Italy
Expatriate footballers in the Netherlands
Expatriate footballers in Croatia